The marsh rabbit (Sylvilagus palustris) is a small cottontail rabbit found in marshes and swamps of coastal regions of the Eastern and Southern United States.  It is a strong swimmer and found only near regions of water.  It is similar in appearance to the eastern cottontail (Sylvilagus floridanus) but is characterized by smaller ears, legs, and tail.

Terminology

The scientific name Sylvilagus palustris derives from a combination of the Latin words silva ("forest") and lagos ("hare"), plus palustris ("of the marsh"). The marsh rabbit has commonly been associated with the group of swamp rabbits; however, this name is not a synonym and should not be confused with the larger swamp rabbit (Sylvilagus aquaticus) of Alabama through Texas.  Marsh rabbits have also often been referred to as marsh hares.

Phylogeny
Subgenus Tapeti in the genus Sylvilagus, marsh rabbits (S. palustris), and swamp rabbits (S. aquaticus), share a chromosomal karyotype derived from a common ancestor and have a diploid number of 2n=38.  Molecular data analysis from sequencing the mitochondrial 12S ribosomal RNA gene confirms that S. palustris and S. aquaticus are sister taxa under their subgenus.  Since this gene evolves very slowly in most organisms, it is very useful in determining genetic origins of closely related species.

Size
Marsh rabbits are typically smaller than eastern cottontail rabbits.

Subspecies
Three subspecies of Sylvilagus palustris have been identified:

Carolina marsh rabbit (Sylvilagus palustris palustris) – marsh rabbit of mainland regions
Florida marsh rabbit (Sylvilagus palustris paludicola) – smaller rabbit confined to the peninsular regions of Florida.
Lower Keys marsh rabbit (Sylvilagus palustris hefneri) – classified as an endangered species.

Appearance
Marsh rabbits display a blackish brown or dark reddish dorsal surface. The belly is a dingy brownish gray in most but can also have a dull white appearance in mainland rabbits.  The leading edges of the ears display small black tufts with ochre on the inside.  rough hair on the dorsal side can be fringed with black hairs.  The black portions of the upper parts often change to a dull grayish buff in spring and summer months, returning to a reddish or ochre color in fall, followed by darker black in the winter.  Rabbits of peninsular Florida typically display darker and redder colors with a cinnamon-rufous nape, feet, and legs.  Juveniles display much darker and duller colors than adults.

One feature that distinguishes marsh rabbits from swamp rabbits and cottontails is that the underside of the tail is almost never white but more brownish gray.  Another curious feature observed in specimens from southern Florida is melanism.  These individuals exhibit completely black phenotypic coloration that does not change seasonally.

Marsh rabbits have a number of features that distinguish them from cottontails and swamp rabbits.  The short ears and legs are much smaller than that of a swamp rabbit.  The tail is also much reduced from the bushy tail seen in cottontails.

Range

The mainland marsh rabbit (S. p. palustris) ranges from the Dismal Swamp, Virginia, along the eastern coast to northern sections of Florida and through the Gulf Coast into Mobile Bay, Alabama.  It occupies coastal lowland areas, swamps, and rivers and is rarely found more than forty miles from the coast.  The Florida marsh rabbit (S. p. paludicola), occupies the peninsular region of Florida, from south of the Florida Panhandle to the upper Keys.  There is a region north of Miami along the east coast where this subspecies is not found.  The endangered Lower Keys marsh rabbit (S. p. hefneri), is only found in the southern Florida Keys.

Habitat
The marsh rabbit commonly inhabits brackish and freshwater marshes, mainly of cattails and cypress.  In southern Florida, they commonly occupy sandy islands and mangrove swamps.  They are strictly limited to regions with ready access to water, unlike most rabbits.  Often, they will enter tidal marshes, but remain near high ground for protection.  Normal hiding spots include dense thickets of magnolia, Blackgum (Nyssa Sylvatica), Sweetgum (Liquidambar styraciflua), briers, and cattails.

Reproduction
Breeding in marsh rabbits occurs year-round.  Typical brood sizes are 2 to 4 young with a gestation period of 30 to 37 days.  Adult females produce up to 6 litters per year with an average annual production of 15 to 20 young.  Nests are built from rushes, grasses, and leaves.  The well-covered nest is lined with hair from the adult rabbits.  They are often found in dense thickets or swampy places completely surrounded by water for protection.

Diet

Marsh rabbits are strictly herbivorous. Typically, they feed on leaves and bulbs of marsh plants including cattails, brushes, and grasses. They can also feed on other aquatic or marsh plants such as centella, greenbrier vine, marsh pennywort, water hyacinth, wild potato, and amaryllis.

Marsh rabbits, like all rabbits, reingest their food, a practice known as coprophagy. Rabbits excrete both hard and soft fecal pellets. These soft pellets, known as cecal pellets, are quickly eaten to be redigested and remove further nutrients. Since rabbits lack a crop displayed in ruminants such as cows and sheep, this process is an alternative method for extracting more nutrients from partially digested plant material.

Behavior

Marsh rabbits are most active nocturnally; they spend most of the daylight hours resting in hidden areas.  Frequent hiding spots include dense thickets, hollow logs, and stands of cattails and grasses.  They have also been known to take advantage of the abandoned burrows of other animals.  Marsh rabbits frequently make runway trails in dense vegetation along marsh edges.  These trails can be identified easily as the rabbits mark active runways with fecal pellets.

One very distinguishing habit of marsh rabbits is that they walk on all fours, placing each foot down alternately like a cat.  Although they can hop like all rabbits, they are more agile in dense vegetation with this walking tendency.  This smaller gait has been measured at 3.5-6.5 in (8.9-16.5 cm) between steps.  The major characteristic of the footprint pattern not seen in other rabbits is widely spread toes.

Marsh rabbits are more aquatic than swamp rabbits as they are not known to inhabit forests.  They take to water readily and are excellent swimmers.  To aid in swimming, the hind legs have less fur and longer nails than typical cottontails.  When not concealed in dense thickets, the rabbits will stay submerged in muddy water with only their eyes and noses exposed and ears laid back flat.  When they have been spotted, they will readily take to water and swim quickly to a new hiding spot or floating vegetation.  Because marsh rabbits possess very short hind legs, they typically rely on doubling and turning when running to evade predators.  This often leads to easy capture by dogs.  When flushed out of hiding spots, they may squeal as they escape.

Birds of prey such as the great horned owl and northern harrier or marsh hawk are the major predators of the rabbits.  Other predators include alligators, snakes, bobcats, foxes, and coyotes.

Human interaction
In regions of the South, marsh rabbits are regularly hunted along with swamp rabbits by burning large patches of dried grass to flush them out.  In some states, the marsh rabbit is considered a game animal and is regulated by the Department of Natural Resources.  For example, South Carolina establishes a hunting season from November 27 to March 2 with a 5 rabbit per day bag limit.  In Virginia, marsh rabbit hunting is managed by the Department of Game and Inland Fisheries.

With their diet of mainly aquatic plants, marsh rabbits are considered minor agricultural pests to most economically viable crops.  In southern Florida, however, they are considered major pests of sugar cane fields.

Cultural references
In Georgia, the marsh rabbit is known as pontoon.  In Alabama, swamp rabbits (or cane-cutters) are often mistaken for marsh rabbits. In many regions of the Eastern US where it is served in restaurants, "marsh rabbit" is actually a euphemism for muskrat meat. True marsh rabbit meat is often prepared as a stew, or it may be marinated, covered in flour, and fried.

References

Sylvilagus
Mammals of the United States
Fauna of the Southeastern United States
Mammals described in 1837
Taxa named by John Bachman
Articles containing video clips